Hayley Victoria Chan (Chan Hei-man, born 10 January 1991 in Hong Kong) is a Hong Kong windsurfer, who specialised in Neil Pryde RS:X class. She captured a silver medal in windsurfing at the 2010 Asian Games, and later represented Hong Kong at the 2012 Summer Olympics. Chan trains for the Windsurfing Association of Hong Kong under her personal coach Chan Hai Shun. As of September 2013, Chan is ranked fourth in the world for the sailboard class by the International Sailing Federation, following her successes at the One World Championships in Boracay, Philippines and at the World Championships in Buzios, Brazil.

Chan made her official worldwide debut at the 2010 Asian Games in Guangzhou, China, where she captured a silver medal in the women's Mistral class with a net score of 21, trailing host nation's Wang Ning by eight points.

At the 2012 Summer Olympics in London, Chan competed in the women's RS:X class after receiving a berth through her result at the World Championships in Perth, Western Australia. She narrowly missed a chance to sail for the medal race by seven points, finishing twelfth in a fleet of twenty-six sailors with a net score of 96 points.

References

External links
 
 
 
 

1991 births
Living people
Hong Kong windsurfers
Female windsurfers
Hong Kong female sailors (sport)
Olympic sailors of Hong Kong
Sailors at the 2012 Summer Olympics – RS:X
Sailors at the 2020 Summer Olympics – RS:X
Asian Games medalists in sailing
Asian Games gold medalists for Hong Kong
Asian Games silver medalists for Hong Kong
Sailors at the 2010 Asian Games
Sailors at the 2014 Asian Games
Sailors at the 2018 Asian Games
Medalists at the 2010 Asian Games
Medalists at the 2014 Asian Games
Medalists at the 2018 Asian Games